Ujjawal Chopra is an Indian Bollywood and television actor. He played the character of Gora Singh in Sanjay Leela Bhansali's Padmaavat, and as Solanki in Special 26.

Career
Chopra is an Indian actor who is best known for his appearances in multiple television serials and commercial Hindi movies. He is considered as a famous face in television advertising commercials. During his initial modeling days, he appeared in a lot of advertisement campaigns for some of the most reputed organizations and brands. In 2003, he was seen in the famous movie ‘Waisa Bhi Hota Hai Part 2’ (2003), which was a sequel of the movie of the same name. He was seen in different movies playing a wide variety of roles. His works are Hijack (2008) Love Khichdi (2009), Bittoo Boss (2012), Maximum (2012) & Special 26 (2013).

Filmography

Films

Television

Web series

References

External links
 

Living people
Indian male film actors
Year of birth missing (living people)